Bohdanov (feminine: Bohdanova) is a Ukrainian-language surname literally meaning "Bohdan's (descendant)" . The Russian-lanuage equivalent is Bogdanov, Belarusian: Bahdanau. Notable people with this surname include:

Andriy Bohdanov
Vitaliy Bohdanov

Ukrainian-language surnames
Patronymic surnames